Justice Shah Nawaz Khan, was a Mina Khel, Marwat, from Lakki Marwat District, Pakistan.

He remained the Chief Justice of North-West Frontier Province and later remained Judge Supreme Court of Pakistan from 5 April 1981 to 1 July 1982. He also remained acting Governor of Khyber Pakhtunkhwa (previously North West Frontier Province).

References

See also
 Marwat
 Khan Habibullah Khan
 Anwar Kamal Khan

Pakistani judges
Pashtun people
Governors of Khyber Pakhtunkhwa
Chief Justices of the Peshawar High Court
Justices of the Supreme Court of Pakistan
Possibly living people
Year of birth missing